The European and African Zone is one of the three zones of regional Davis Cup competition in 2007.

In the European and African Zone there are four different groups in which teams compete against each other to advance to the next group.

Participating teams

Draw

Luxembourg and Portugal relegated to Group II in 2008.
Slovakia, Israel, Serbia, and Great Britain advance to World Group Play-off.

First Round Matches

Israel vs. Luxembourg

Georgia vs. Portugal

Second Round Matches

Slovakia vs. Macedonia

Israel vs. Italy

Serbia vs. Georgia

Great Britain vs. Netherlands

First Round Play-offs Matches

Italy vs. Luxembourg

Second Round Play-offs Matches

Macedonia vs. Luxembourg

Netherlands vs. Portugal

References

2007 Davis Cup Europe/Africa Zone
Davis Cup Europe/Africa Zone